Jamestown West is a census-designated place (CDP) located near Jamestown in Chautauqua County, New York, United States. Also known as West Ellicott because of its location in the Town of Ellicott, the area population was 2,408 as of the 2010 census.

Jamestown West is located in a nook between the city of Jamestown and the villages of Celoron and Lakewood. It is a substantial retail center in the county, serving as the location of several of the area's big-box stores that stretch along Fairmount Avenue.

Geography

Demographics

As of the census of 2000, there were 2,535 people, 1,015 households, and 687 families residing in the CDP. The population density was 1,009.4 per square mile (389.9/km2). There were 1,061 housing units at an average density of 422.5/sq mi (163.2/km2). The racial makeup of the CDP was 98.54% White, 0.24% African American, 0.16% Native American, 0.47% Asian, 0.12% from other races, and 0.47% from two or more races. Hispanic or Latino of any race were 0.67% of the population.

There were 1,015 households, out of which 27.4% had children under the age of 18 living with them, 58.3% were married couples living together, 7.0% had a female householder with no husband present, and 32.3% were non-families. 28.4% of all households were made up of individuals, and 15.9% had someone living alone who was 65 years of age or older. The average household size was 2.35 and the average family size was 2.89.

In the CDP, the population was spread out, with 21.6% under the age of 18, 4.4% from 18 to 24, 22.3% from 25 to 44, 26.3% from 45 to 64, and 25.4% who were 65 years of age or older. The median age was 46 years. For every 100 females, there were 88.3 males. For every 100 females age 18 and over, there were 82.4 males.

The median income for a household in the CDP was $41,544, and the median income for a family was $52,688. Males had a median income of $41,633 versus $22,250 for females. The per capita income for the CDP was $21,401. About 3.7% of families and 7.2% of the population were below the poverty line, including 14.7% of those under age 18 and 3.4% of those age 65 or over.

In popular culture
Fictional character Lucy Ricardo, the lead character in I Love Lucy, was said to be from West Jamestown. Actress Lucille Ball, who portrayed the character, was born in Jamestown and spent most of her childhood in Celoron, both communities that are adjacent to Jamestown West.

References

Jamestown, New York
Census-designated places in New York (state)
Census-designated places in Chautauqua County, New York